Tyburn may refer to the following places in England:

London
 Tyburn a medieval village, now part of central London, named after Tyburn (stream), a river in London.
 the unrelated Tyburn Brook, a tributary of the River Westbourne
 the Tyburn Tree, a place of public execution.

Others
 Tyburn, West Midlands, an electoral ward in Birmingham
 York's Tyburn